Lake Leake (palawa kani: kunawi) is the name of both a man-made water storage reservoir and a small township (Australian Postcode 7210) in the eastern midlands of Tasmania. The locality is split between two local authorities, as follows:
 Northern Midlands Council (53%), 
 Glamorgan-Spring Bay Council (47%)

The lake can hold  of water.  The lake was named after Charles Henry Leake a member of the Tasmanian Legislative Council. At the 2006 census, Lake Leake had a population of 176.

Features and location

The lake is used for recreational fishing, for brook trout, brown trout and rainbow trout.

The village is built on land owned by the Northern Midlands Council.  Inhabitants must purchase a license to have a building there are restricted in the number of days per year they can live there.  The main purpose is to accommodate recreational anglers.

Water flowing out from the lake has an electrical conductivity of 56 μS/cm.

Rawlinna is a locality located between the south side of the lake and Lake Yaleena, another water impoundment. Lake Yaleena is a privately built dammed lake, specifically for fishing. It is a business that includes accommodation in cabins.

History
The traditional custodians of the area were the Peenrymairmemener clan of the North Midlands Nation. The area was originally a wetland, or series of lagoons, and was transcribed by Europeans as koan.ner.we (written in palawa kani as kunawi).  The area was described by contemporary colonial British as a 'resort of the natives' - an Aboriginal meeting place, and contemporaries describe finding several Aboriginal huts in the area. The area contains remains of Aboriginal artifacts and a quarry where the Peenrymairmemener crafted stone tools.

The area was renamed by colonials 'Kearney's Bogs' and then Lake Leake after the dam was constructed. The reservoir was constructed after a long debate. Water is released for irrigation and also stored to maintain a fishing facility. Lake Leake is usually at least half full.

References

Extra links

 updated once a day
 updated once a day, includes evaporation, wind run and hours of sun

Towns in Tasmania
Leake
Midlands (Tasmania)